Dundee is an unincorporated community in Ohio County, Kentucky, United States.

Climate
The climate in this area is characterized by hot, humid summers and generally mild to cool winters.  According to the Köppen Climate Classification system, Dundee has a humid subtropical climate, abbreviated "Cfa" on climate maps.

References

Unincorporated communities in Ohio County, Kentucky
Unincorporated communities in Kentucky